Solomon da Silva Solis-Cohen (1857–1948) was an American physician, professor of medicine and prominent Zionist.

Biography
Solomon Solis-Cohen was educated at public schools in Philadelphia. He received the Bachelor of Arts degree in 1872 and the Master of Arts degree in 1877 from Philadelphia's Central High School. He taught Hebrew in the school of the Hebrew Education Society of Philadelphia for two years while studying medicine (1881–1883) and received his medical degree from the Jefferson Medical College in 1883.

Solis-Cohen taught in 1887–1902 at the Philadelphia Polyclinic and in 1890–1892 at Dartmouth College. He was a professor of clinical medicine at Jefferson Medical College from 1902 to 1927, when he retired as professor emeritus. He was a fellow of the American Association for the Advancement of Science and a trustee of the U.S. Pharmacopoeia Convention. His basic research in medicine was widely noted.

He was a founder and trustee of the Jewish Theological Seminary of America and a founder of the Jewish Publication Society of America. He attended the Third Zionist Congress at Basel in 1899 and was a member of the provisional executive of the Zionist Organization of America for some time during WWI.

He published a book of his poetry, When love passed by and other verses: including translations from Hebrew poets of the Middle Ages (1929), and a selection of his writings and addresses, Judaism and science, with and other addresses and papers (1940).

Family 
In 1885, Solis-Cohen married his cousin Emily Grace Solis. They had three sons (David Hays, Leon and Francis Nathan) and one daughter (Emily Elvira). Jacob da Silva Solis-Cohen (1838–1927), a physician and founder of laryngology in the US, was Solomon Solis-Cohen's brother.

Selected publications

with George D. Heist: 
with George D. Heist and Myer Solis-Cohen:

See also
Jews in Philadelphia

References

External links

1857 births
1948 deaths
American medical academics
American Sephardic Jews
Jewish educators
Jewish physicians
Physicians from Philadelphia
Solis-Cohen Family